A catawbiense hybrid is a  hybrid of the plant genus Rhododendron,  derived from crosses of American species Rhododendron catawbiense and Rhododendron maximum with European and Asian species R. arboreum, R. caucasicum and  R. ponticum.

See also
List of Rhododendron species

References

Rhododendron